The Mamer is a river flowing through Luxembourg, joining the Alzette at Mersch.  It flows through the towns of Mamer and Kopstal. The river is an indirect tributary to the river Moselle.

Rivers of Luxembourg
Rivers of Mersch
Mamer